Dharam Gaj Singh (born 7 July 1927) was member of 5th Lok Sabha from Shahabad (Lok Sabha constituency) in Uttar Pradesh State, India. He was born in Dheoramaholia, Hardoi district, Uttar Pradesh.

He was elected to 7th, 8th and 9th Lok Sabha from Shahabad (Lok Sabha constituency).

References

1927 births
People from Hardoi district
India MPs 1980–1984
India MPs 1984–1989
India MPs 1989–1991
India MPs 1971–1977
Lok Sabha members from Uttar Pradesh
Possibly living people
Indian National Congress politicians from Uttar Pradesh